Fort Abbas , , formerly Pholra, is a town in Bahawalnagar District in the Cholistan Desert of Punjab, Pakistan. It is situated south of Haroonabad, near Faqirwali, on the border of Pakistan and India.

History
The city of Fort Abbas was named by Nawab Sir Sadiq after his eldest son, Muhammad Abbas.

See also
 List of forts in Pakistan
 List of museums in Pakistan

References 

Populated places in Bahawalnagar District
Bahawalnagar District
Bahawalpur (princely state)
Cities and towns in Punjab, Pakistan
Cities and towns in Bahawalnagar District